Ciasna  is a village in Lubliniec County, Silesian Voivodeship, in southern Poland. It is the seat of the gmina (administrative district) called Gmina Ciasna.

The village has a population of 1,722.

References

Ciasna